Lopaphus srilankensis, is a species of phasmid or stick insect of the genus Lopaphus. It is found in Sri Lanka. Two subspecies documented. It was first found from Anuradhapura.

Subspecies
Lopaphus srilankensis montanus Hennemann, 2002
Lopaphus srilankensis srilankensis Hennemann, 2002

References

Lonchodidae
Insects of Asia
Insects described in 2002